Diaphanoeca is a genus of choanoflagellates belonging to the family Acanthoecidae.

Species:

Diaphanoeca aperta 
Diaphanoeca cylindrica 
Diaphanoeca fiordensis 
Diaphanoeca grandis 
Diaphanoeca multiannulata 
Diaphanoeca parva 
Diaphanoeca pedicellata 
Diaphanoeca sphaerica 
Diaphanoeca undulata

References

Choanoflagellatea